Alcaudete is a city located in the province of Jaén, Andalusia, Spain. As of 2018, it has a population of 10,558. It is home to a 12th-14th century Moorish castle, located on the top of the hill commanding the town. Other sights include the Iglesia de Santa María la Mayor (15th century).

The city was established on the site of the Roman settlement of Sosontigi, which was part of the Conventus Astigitanus. The town of Fravasoson was 3 to 5 miles away.

Twin towns
 Manlleu, Spain
 Santa Margarida de Montbui, Spain

References

Municipalities in the Province of Jaén (Spain)